Zelippistes is a genus of small sea snails, marine gastropod molluscs in the family Capulidae, the cap snails. This genus was previously placed in the family Trichotropidae.

Species
Species within the genus Zelippistes include:
 Zelippistes benhami (Suter, 1902)
 Zelippistes excentricus Petuch, 1979

References

External links 
 Gastropods.com
 Powell A. W. B., New Zealand Mollusca, William Collins Publishers Ltd, Auckland, New Zealand 1979 

Capulidae
Gastropod genera
Taxa named by Harold John Finlay